is a private junior college in Komatsu, Ishikawa, Japan, established in 1988.

External links
 Official website

References
 Komatsu University

Japanese junior colleges
Educational institutions established in 1988
Private universities and colleges in Japan
Universities and colleges in Ishikawa Prefecture
1988 establishments in Japan
Komatsu, Ishikawa